A Boy. A Girl. A Dream. is a 2018 American romantic drama film directed by Qasim Basir, who wrote the screenplay with Samantha Tanner. The film stars Omari Hardwick and Meagan Good.

Synopsis

Samuel Goldwyn Films writes, "On the night of the 2016 Presidential election, Cass, an L.A. club promoter, takes a thrilling and emotional journey with Frida, a Midwestern visitor. She challenges him to revisit his broken dreams—while he pushes her to discover hers."

Cast
Omari Hardwick
Meagan Good
Jay Ellis
Dijon Talton
Wesley Jonathan
Affion Crockett

Critical reception

The similar website Metacritic surveyed  and assessed 3 reviews as positive and 2 as mixed. It gave an weighted average score of 65 out of 100, which it said indicated "generally favorable reviews".

See also
List of black films of the 2010s

References

External links
 

2018 films
American romantic drama films
One-shot films
Films set in 2016
2010s English-language films
2010s American films